Marcus Joseph Lewis Marshall (born 7 October 1989) is an English professional footballer who plays as a winger for Mickleover.

He has previously played for Blackburn Rovers where he came through the club's youth academy but only made one League Cup appearance. He also went on to play professionally for Rotherham United, Macclesfield Town, Bury, Grimsby Town, Morecambe and Lincoln City. He has since played in Non-League football with Boston United, Coalville Town, Alfreton Town, Hyde United, Matlock Town, Basford United and AFC Telford United.

Career

Blackburn Rovers
Marshall was a youth product of Premier League side Blackburn Rovers. He was added to the club's first team squad in August 2008 ahead of the 2008–09 season. On 27 August 2008 Sam Allardyce handed him his first team debut when he came on as a 76th-minute substitute for Morten Gamst Pedersen in a 4–1 victory over Grimsby Town in the 1st Round of the League Cup. The game would be Marshall's only outing for the Blackburn first team and he spent the rest of the campaign in the reserves.

Rotherham United
On 23 January 2010, Marshall was signed on a month's emergency loan by Rotherham United. On 30 June, Marshall became a free agent when it was confirmed he would not be offered a new contract by Blackburn. He agreed to join Rotherham permanently on 1 July. Marshall scored his first career goal in Rotherham's 4–1 League Cup First Round defeat to Peterborough United. His first competitive league goal eventually came in a 2–2 draw with Northampton Town on 23 November 2010. He joined fellow League Two side Macclesfield Town on a one-month emergency loan in January 2012, scoring on his debut against Cheltenham Town, and was released by Rotherham in May 2012.

Bury
On 3 July 2012, Marshall joined League One club Bury.

Loan to Grimsby Town

In November 2012, he joined Grimsby Town on an initial one-month loan. Having impressed during his loan spell, Grimsby joint-managers Rob Scott and Paul Hurst admitted their intentions to extend Marshall's stay at Blundell Park. On 31 December 2012, Marshall extended his loan deal until the end of the 2012–13 season. On 21 January 2013, Bury recalled Marshall from his loan spell, amidst speculation of a bid from rivals Luton Town which if confirmed would make him the second Grimsby loanee to be poached by Luton during the 2013 January transfer window. Grimsby joint-manager Rob Scott said of the matter "We're fighting to keep Marcus but the offer that Luton have put in is ridiculous really. The amount of money that they've offered for him when he's out contract at the end of the season is ridiculous, but that's their business."

On 24 January 2013 it was revealed that despite Bury and Luton agreeing a fee, Marshall had rejected a move to Luton paving the way to a potential return to Grimsby. On 25 January 2013 Marshall re-signed for Grimsby on loan for the remainder of the season. On 29 January 2013, less than a week after rejecting Luton he scored the third goal against them in Grimsby's 3–0 FA Trophy quarter final victory. At the end of the season Marshall returned to Bury with Grimsby manager Paul Hurst quoting: "the club could still move for the player on a permanent deal, while also admitting that Marshall's performances had dipped towards the end of the season."

Morecambe
On 19 June 2013 Marshall signed a two-year deal with Morecambe.

Loan to Lincoln City

Having endured a difficult first season at Morecambe, Marshall was made available for transfer and was loaned out to Lincoln City for the entire 2014–15 season.

Return to Grimsby Town
On 29 June 2015, Marshall signed for Conference National side Grimsby Town on a one-year deal.

Marshall was released when his contract expired at the end of the season.

Non-League
Following his release from Grimsby, Marshall signed a one-year deal for National League North side Boston United. Marshall signed for Coalville Town on loan on 24 March 2017.

On 19 June 2017 Marshall signed with Alfreton Town. He joined Hyde United on a one-month loan deal in December 2017, debuting in the club's 3–1 home victory over Scarborough Athletic on 23 December 2017. He returned to Alfreton Town at the completion of the loan period.

On 13 June 2018 he joined Matlock Town.

On 27 March 2020, Marshall joined Basford United for an undisclosed fee.

On 17 January 2022, he returned to Northern Premier League Premier Division rivals Matlock Town for an undisclosed fee along with Terry Hawkridge.

On 22 March 2022, Marshall signed a short-term contract with National League North side AFC Telford United that would expire at the end of the 2021–22 season.

Marshall was released at the end of the 2021–22 season.

Marshall signed for Mickleover in May 2022 ahead of the 2022–23 season.

Career statistics

Honours

Grimsby Town
FA Trophy: Runners-up, 2012–13
National League: play-off winners 2015–16

References

External links

1989 births
Living people
Footballers from Hammersmith
English footballers
Association football forwards
Blackburn Rovers F.C. players
Rotherham United F.C. players
Macclesfield Town F.C. players
Bury F.C. players
Morecambe F.C. players
Lincoln City F.C. players
Grimsby Town F.C. players
Boston United F.C. players
Coalville Town F.C. players
Alfreton Town F.C. players
Hyde United F.C. players
Matlock Town F.C. players
Basford United F.C. players
AFC Telford United players
Mickleover Sports F.C. players
English Football League players
National League (English football) players
Northern Premier League players